The 1994 GP Ouest-France was the 58th edition of the GP Ouest-France cycle race and was held on 23 August 1994. The race started and finished in Plouay. The race was won by Andrei Tchmil of the Lotto team.

General classification

References

1994
1994 in road cycling
1994 in French sport
August 1994 sports events in Europe